Anette Sagen (born 10 January 1985) is a Norwegian former ski jumper.

Career
She is one of the best female jumpers of all time. She received a lot of media attention in 2004, when she was denied the opportunity to jump K-185 in Vikersund, in spite of her good results. The struggle was over whether the quality of female ski jumpers was high enough to allow women to jump in these venues. Torbjørn Yggeseth, the chairman of the ski jump committee of the International Ski Federation, was Sagen's main opponent. The debate soon developed into a struggle over women's rights in the world of sports.

Competing since 2003, Sagen won the women's ski jumping event at the Holmenkollen ski festival in 2004 and 2005, the last two years the event was held. She also has forty additional victories as of 2009.

On 20 February 2009 Sagen won the bronze medal in the first ever World Championship ski jumping competition for women.

After a plebiscite and the decision by the city council in Oslo, Sagen received the honour of being the de jure first ski jumper in the new Holmenkollen.

World Cup

Standings

Wins

References

External links
 
 Holmenkollen winners since 1892 - click Vinnere for downloadable pdf file 

1985 births
Living people
People from Vefsn
Holmenkollen Ski Festival winners
Norwegian female ski jumpers
FIS Nordic World Ski Championships medalists in ski jumping
Holmenkollen medalists
Sportspeople from Nordland